Olcott is a surname. Notable people with the surname include:

Ben W. Olcott (1872–1952), 16th Governor of Oregon
Charles S. Olcott (1864-1935), American non-fiction writer
Chauncey Olcott (1858–1932), American stage actor and songwriter
Frederic P. Olcott (1841–1909), American banker and politician
Henry Steel Olcott (1832–1907), co-founder and first president of the Theosophical Society
J. Van Vechten Olcott (1856–1940), U.S. Representative
James B. Olcott (1830–1910), American farmer and agronomist
Martha Brill Olcott (born 1949), leading U.S. expert on Central Asian and the Caspian
Sidney Olcott (1873–1949), Canadian film producer, director, actor and screenwriter
Simeon Olcott (1735–1815), United States Senator
William J. Olcott (1862-1935), American mining engineer and executive
William M. K. Olcott (1862–1933), New York lawyer and politician
William Tyler Olcott (1873–1936), American lawyer and amateur astronomer